The Women's FIH Hockey Nations Cup is an international women's field hockey tournament organised annually by the International Hockey Federation. The tournament serves as the qualification tournament for the Women's FIH Pro League.

The tournament was founded in 2019 and the first edition was held in December 2022 in Valencia, Spain.

Format
The tournament features the eight highest ranked teams in the FIH Women's World Ranking not participating in the Women's FIH Pro League. The winner of the tournament will be promoted to the following year's FIH Pro League to replace the bottom team who will be relegated. The team will only be promoted if they meet the necessary requirements for participation in the Pro League. The winner of the first edition will qualify for the 2023–24 season of the FIH Pro League.

Results

Team appearances

See also
Men's FIH Hockey Nations Cup
Women's FIH Pro League

References

External links
International Hockey Federation

 
Nations Cup
FIH Hockey Nations Cup